The 1970 California lieutenant gubernatorial election was held on November 3, 1970. Incumbent Republican Edwin Reinecke defeated Democratic nominee Al Alquist with 54.79% of the vote.

Primary elections
Primary elections were held on June 2, 1970.

Democratic primary

Candidates
Al Alquist, State Senator
Robert A. Wenke
Robert L. Coate
Cecilia A. Pedroza

Results

General election

Candidates
Major party candidates
Edwin Reinecke, Republican
Al Alquist, Democratic 

Other candidates
John Haag, Peace and Freedom
Merwun H. Hemp, American Independent

Results

References

California
1970
Lieutenant